Subway is an American multinational fast food restaurant franchise that specializes in submarine sandwiches (subs), wraps, salads and drinks.  
  
Subway was founded by Fred DeLuca and financed by Peter Buck in 1965 as Pete's Super Submarines in Bridgeport, Connecticut. After several name changes in the beginning years, it was finally renamed Subway in 1972, and a franchise operation began in 1974 with a second restaurant in Wallingford, Connecticut. Since then, it has expanded to become a global franchise.

Subway serves an array of topping choices, allowing the customer to choose which toppings are included in their sandwich. The longtime Subway slogan, "Eat Fresh", is intended to indicate the fresh ingredients that are used in their sandwiches.

It was the fastest-growing franchise in the world in 2015 and, as of June 2021, had 37,540 locations in more than 100 countries and territories. More than half its locations (21,796 or 58.1%) are in the United States. It also is the largest single-brand restaurant chain, and the largest restaurant operator in the world. Its international headquarters is in Milford, Connecticut.

History

In 1965, Fred DeLuca borrowed $1,000 from friend Peter Buck to start "Pete's Drive-In: Super Submarines" at 3851 Main Street in Bridgeport, Connecticut, and in the following year, they formed Doctor's Associates Inc. to oversee operations of the restaurants as the franchise expanded. The holding company derives its name from DeLuca's goal to earn enough from the business to pay tuition for medical school, as well as Buck's having a doctorate in physics. In 1968, the sandwich shop was renamed "Subway".

In 1974, a franchise operation began with a restaurant in Wallingford, Connecticut.

The first Subway on the West Coast was opened in Fresno, California, in 1978. The first Subway outside of North America opened in Bahrain in December 1984. The first Subway in the United Kingdom was opened in Brighton in 1996. In 2004 Subway began opening stores in Walmart supercenters, and surpassed the number of McDonald's locations inside U.S. Walmart stores in 2007.

Since 2007, Subway has consistently ranked in the Entrepreneur Franchise 500. In 2015, it ranked #3 on the "Top Global Franchises" list, and #1 as the "Fastest Growing Franchise". At the end of 2010, Subway became the largest fast food chain worldwide, with 33,749 restaurants – 1,012 more than McDonald's.

In January 2015, Suzanne Greco became president and CEO. Her brother Fred DeLuca, the company's first CEO, had been ill for two years and died of leukemia in September 2015.

Subway reached a peak of 27,129 US locations on Jan. 1, 2016, but has since shrunk year after year, declining 22 percent by the end of 2021. In 2016, Subway closed hundreds of restaurants in the U.S., experiencing a net loss in locations for the first time. However, with 26,744 locations, it remained the most ubiquitous restaurant chain in the U.S. (with McDonald's in the #2 spot).

In July 2017, Subway unveiled redesigned restaurants, dubbed "Fresh Forward", with a new company logo. Features include self-order kiosks; USB charging ports at tables; and new menu items, including additional condiments, and bread made without gluten.

In 2017, the chain closed more than 800 of its U.S. locations. In April 2018, the chain announced it would close about 500 more that year. According to Abha Bhattarai of The Washington Post, this was a result of three consecutive years of falling profits and a 25 percent reduction in foot traffic in Subway stores since 2012. Franchisees also complained that the company's deep promotions further ate away at profits. Industry analysts such as Bob Phibbs, chief executive of the New York-based consulting firm Retail Doctor, said changing tastes on the part of consumers, who more frequently prefer locally sourced produce and hormone-free meat served by regional start-ups such as Sweetgreen, especially in metropolitan areas, were the cause of the drop in Subway's sales, as well as the loss of market share to competitors. These include fast-casual eateries and sandwich shops such as Panera Bread, Au Bon Pain and Firehouse Subs, as well as food trucks and grocery stores that offer freshly made meals at competitive prices. In January 2018, Subway invested $25 million in a re-branding campaign targeting young consumers to revitalize its image and boost sales. In December 2020, Subway partnered with ezCater to offer a new online catering platform.

The company closed 999 more US Subway locations than it opened in 2019, a further 1,609 net in 2020 (in substantial part due to the COVID-19 pandemic in the United States, and a net 1,043 outlets in 2021, leaving it with 21,147 locations.

In 2023, the family announced that they were in the process of selling the company to private ownership. The company has enlisted the help of JP Morgan with the sale. The price of the company is reported to be around $10 billion. Several potential buyers have made offers for the company. These include the asset management division of investment bank Goldman Sachs, TDR Capital, and TPG Inc.

Corporate structure
, the Subway Group of companies was organized as follows:
Subway IP Inc. is the owner of the intellectual property for the restaurant system. 
Franchise World Headquarters, LLC leads franchising operations. FWH Technologies, LLC owns and licenses Subway's point of sale software.
Franchisors include Doctor's Associates Inc. in the U.S.; Subway International B.V.; Subway Franchise Systems of Canada, Ltd.; etc. 
Advertising affiliates include Subway Franchisee Advertising Fund Trust, Ltd.; Subway Franchisee Advertising Fund Trust, B.V.; Subway Franchisee Canadian Advertising Trust; etc.
IPC Europe (Independent Purchasing Company Europe Limited), manager of the Subway franchisees and the Subcard loyalty scheme in European countries.

Subway's international headquarters are in Milford, Connecticut, the US, with five regional centers supporting the company's international operations. The regional offices for European franchises are located in Amsterdam (Netherlands); the Australian and New Zealand locations are supported from Brisbane (Australia); the Asian locations are supported from offices in Beirut (Lebanon) and Singapore; and the Latin American support center is in Miami (US).

The startup cost of owning a Subway franchise is significantly lower than competitors, beginning at around $200,000 to $500,000. However, Subway franchisees also pay some of the highest percentages of profits (around 12.5%) back to Subway compared to competitors.

Locations

As of June 2021, Subway has approximately 41,600 locations in 104 countries and territories, all independently owned. These locations are largely concentrated in North America, with 21,796 in the United States, 2,881 in Canada, and 758 in Mexico; this is almost as many U.S. locations as McDonald's and Starbucks combined. Outside North America, the countries with the most locations are Australia (1,215), Brazil (approximately 1,643), and the United Kingdom (approximately 2,195).

Products

Subway's core product is the submarine sandwich (or "sub"). In addition to these, the chain also sells wraps, salad, paninis, and baked goods (including cookies, doughnuts, and muffins).

Subway's best-selling sandwich, the B.M.T. (short for "Biggest, Meatiest, Tastiest"), contains pepperoni, salami, and ham. The name originally stood for Brooklyn Manhattan Transit.

Subway also sells breakfast sandwiches, English muffins, and flatbread. In 2006, "personal pizzas" debuted in some US markets. These are made to order (like the subs) and heated for 85 seconds. Breakfast and pizza items are only available in select locations. In November 2009, Subway signed a deal to serve exclusively Seattle's Best Coffee coffee as part of its breakfast menu in the US.

A 2009 Zagat survey named Subway the best provider of "Healthy Options" (in the "Mega Chain" category). Subway was also first in "Top Service" and "Most Popular" rankings. It placed second in "Top Overall", behind Wendy's.

In April 2017, Subway announced the addition of paninis to its menu. Chipotle Steak & Cheese, Triple Cheese, Chicken Cordon Bleu, and Italian B.M.T. Melt were the four variations announced.

In September 2018, Subway debuted the Chipotle Cheesesteak sandwich for a limited time. Regional testing of a crispy chicken sandwich also began taking place in Arkansas.

Regional variations
Subway's menu varies between countries, most significantly where religious requirements relate to the meats served.

In 2006, the first kosher Subway restaurant in the United States opened in a suburb of Cleveland, Ohio in the Mandel Jewish Community Center of Cleveland. Former Subway spokesman Jared Fogle attended the opening. A press release stated, "With slight modifications, such as no pork-based products, and the use of soy-based cheese product, the menu is virtually identical to that of any other Subway restaurant." Other openings soon followed, briefly making Subway one of the largest U.S. kosher restaurant chains. At their peak, twelve kosher Subway locations were open in the U.S., including Kansas City and 5 in New York. As of 2011, only five remained: in Cleveland, Miami, Los Angeles, and two stores in Maryland. Franchisees who failed noted a lack of support from the parent location in advertising, higher costs of kosher food and supervision, the inability to remain open on Saturdays, and that customers who do not keep kosher prefer the original menu and prices.

Subway opened its first restaurant in India in 2001 in New Delhi. In deference to Hindu beliefs, Subway restaurants in India do not serve beef products; on the other hand, the country's large number of vegetarians induced Subway's Indian outlets to offer a much-extended range of vegetarian options. As of January 2017, there were 591 Subway restaurants in 68 Indian cities. On September 4, 2012, Subway opened its first all-vegetarian outlet on the campus of Lovely Professional University (LPU) in Jalandhar, Punjab. On March 6, 2013, Subway opened its second all-vegetarian outlet also offering Jain food in Paldi, Ahmedabad.

Nutritional content
In 2011, Subway introduced gluten-free bread and brownies to some locations in Texas. It also cut the salt content of its sandwiches by 15 percent in 2011.

In the United Kingdom and Ireland, Subway has reduced salt content across its entire range by 33% and has committed to further reductions, in line with government targets. Subway's range of "Low Fat" subs is endorsed by the charity Heart Research UK.

Marketing

Subway is the second-biggest fast food advertiser in the United States, behind only McDonald's. It spent US$516,000,000 on measurable advertising in 2011.

Subway used the advertising slogan "Eat Fresh" and focused on how its sandwiches were made from freshly baked bread and fresh ingredients, in front of customers to their exact specifications, by employees which Subway called "Subway Sandwich Artists".

In 2005, Subway scrapped its "Sub Club" stamp promotion, citing a growing number of counterfeit stamps due to online auction sites and the increasing availability of high-quality printers.

In November 2007, Subway's US commercials featured the cartoon character Peter Griffin (from FOX's Family Guy) promoting its new Subway Feast sandwich. Subway has also used "instant win" games, based on the game Scrabble.

Subway ran a product placement campaign in the US TV series Chuck since its first season. As ratings dwindled in the second season, a campaign to "save Chuck" was launched for fans, encouraging them to purchase a footlong sub from Subway on April 27, 2009, the date of the season finale. Tony Pace, Subway's marketing officer, called it the best product placement the restaurant chain has done "in several years."

To celebrate National Sandwich Day on November 3, 2015, Subway offered a Buy One sandwich, Give One sandwich free promotion.

Most Subway locations feature a promotion named "Sub of the Day" where a different submarine sandwich is featured each day of the week at a discounted price. In the past they had a monthly promotion that featured a specialty sub sandwich at a discounted price for the entire month.

Jared Fogle

Beginning in January 2000, Jared Fogle was a national spokesman for the company in the US, giving talks on healthy living and appearing in advertisements. Fogle first came to attention in his native Indiana by claiming that he lost over 200 pounds in part by eating at Subway. After 2008, he was featured less often as the company marketed with more emphasis on its "5 dollar footlong" campaign. Subway attributed between one-third and one-half of its growth from 1998 to 2011 to Fogle, the equivalent of a tripling in size. Subway ended its relationship with Fogle in 2015 after he was charged with possession of child pornography and illicit sexual conduct with a minor. After pleading guilty in August 2015, he was sentenced to more than 15 years in federal prison three months later.

In December 2015, following the removal of Fogle from its marketing, Subway introduced a new marketing campaign, "Founded on Fresh". The campaign focuses on Subway's establishment and early history and features Fred DeLuca, as played by his son, Jonathan. The new campaign downplays the use of jingles and celebrity endorsements (besides "targeted" sports marketing) in favor of focusing on the qualities of its products and specific products. Chief advertising officer Chris Carroll explained that the focus on fat, calories, and weight loss were "what fresh used to be" and that the new campaign would focus more on the sourcing of Subway's ingredients, such as its phase-out of antibiotic-treated meat. Carroll also explained that the new strategy was being developed prior to the controversy involving Fogle.

Sponsorships
Subway has sponsored a number of sports events, particularly NASCAR races, including the Subway 400 (2002–2004), Subway 500 (2003–2007), Subway Fresh 500 (2005–2013) and the Subway Firecracker 250 (2009–2016). Subway sponsored the Subway Super Series ice hockey tournament from 2009 to 2014.

$5 footlongs
In 2008, Subway began to offer all foot-long submarine sandwiches (excluding the premium and double-meat varieties) for five dollars, in the continental United States and Canada, as a "limited time only" promotion. "Five Dollar Footlongs" quickly became the company's most successful promotion ever. Upon the initial promotion's completion, customer response prompted Subway to create a permanent "$5 Footlong Everyday Value Menu" that offered some footlong sandwiches for $5. Since 2011, there has been a monthly rotating $5 footlong. In October 2011, a similar promotion was launched in the United Kingdom. Customers can buy one of nine subs and any drink for £3 (for a six-inch sub) or £5 (for a footlong).

In 2012, San Francisco restaurants discontinued the five-dollar footlong promotion due to the higher cost of doing business in the city. From June 2014 to the end of that year, some Subway locations began discontinuing the $5 dollar promotion. On November 1, 2014, Subway discontinued the five-dollar footlong promotion, replacing it with the Simple $6 Menu which included a six-inch select with a drink and a choice of cookies or chips.

In February 2016, the company announced that all classic footlongs would be priced at $6 each.

In January 2018, the $5 promotion returned with a $4.99 footlong menu of five subs at participating locations.

In September 2018, Subway announced that they were going to discontinue the $5 footlong promotion in order to boost their franchise profits.

Italian Hero
In early 2017, Subway introduced its Italian Hero and advertised it with a campaign describing it as an authentic Italian(-American) sandwich. Created by their national creative agency MMB, two comedic spots feature Italian-American characters on and around the stoop of a tenement building, one including a cameo by sportscaster Dick Vitale. Another ad features Food Network's Jeff Mauro, the "Sandwich King", who is also Italian-American, discussing the nature and role of the different Italian meats and other ingredients.

"Refresh"
In July 2021, Subway debuted its "Refresh" campaign featuring: Tom Brady, Stephen Curry, Serena Williams, and Megan Rapinoe. Subway franchisees requested Rapinoe be pulled from the ads following the 2020 Olympics, claiming her testimonial caused sales to dip and harmed the stores' reputation.

Animal welfare
In December 2015, Subway released a commitment to move to a 100% cage-free egg supply chain in North America by 2025.

In April 2017, Subway released a chicken welfare policy that states that by 2024 or sooner, 100% of its U.S. chicken products will be produced in alignment with Global Animal Partnership (GAP) standards for higher welfare breeds, enhanced living environments (including lighting, litter, and enrichment), increased activity levels and optimized stocking density, and improved slaughter methods. To ensure compliance, Subway's chicken suppliers will be third-party audited with updates communicated annually.

The policy announcement followed a nationwide campaign led by high school animal activist Lia Hyman in coordination with the animal protection NGO The Humane League. On April 20, 2017, Hyman and a group of activists traveled to Subway's global headquarters in Connecticut to deliver more than 53,000 signatures from campaign supporters and held a demonstration outside the building after they were denied entry.

Controversies

Hepatitis A contamination
In September 1999, at least 32 customers in Seattle contracted hepatitis A after eating food contaminated with the virus at two Subway outlets. The virus, which is spread by eating or drinking food or water contaminated with infected feces, infects the liver causing nausea, vomiting, diarrhea, fatigue, and fever. Subsequent investigations found that staff failed to adhere to thorough hand washing and the use of plastic gloves during food preparation. A class-action lawsuit on behalf of 31 victims was resolved for $1.6 million. The most seriously affected victim—a 6-year-old boy—suffered acute liver failure and required a liver transplant. He was awarded $10 million in an out-of-court settlement in 2001. A previous outbreak of hepatitis A in 1996 had also involved a Subway outlet in Seattle, although no legal action had resulted.

In April 2015, the Arkansas Department of Health issued a warning to the public that customers who had eaten at the Subway outlet in Morrilton, Arkansas, may have been exposed to infection after an employee tested positive for the virus.

Sandwich size
The maximum variance in length allowed in Arizona is 3% (for a three-foot sub). In response to the report, Subway said it was reevaluating its advertising, training, and packaging materials with regard to the specific or implied length of Giant Subs and was advising its franchisees to only discuss with customers the approximate number of expected servings and not a specific length of measurement.

Subway responded by saying, "With regards to the size of the bread and calling it a footlong, 'Subway Footlong' is a registered trademark as a descriptive name for the sub sold in Subway Restaurants and not intended to be a measurement of length." Discovery during a subsequent class-action lawsuit revealed that most Subway sandwiches were the advertised length. A $530,000 settlement was thrown out of court in 2017 for being "utterly worthless" to consumers.

Franchise relations
In 1995, Subway Sandwich Shops, Fred DeLuca, Peter Buck, and Doctor's Associates Inc. were held liable for breach of contract. An Illinois jury awarded more than $10 million in damages to Nicholas and Victoria Jannotta after finding lease and contract violations. The plaintiffs claimed the defendants had misrepresented the asset value of Subway Sandwich Shops (a leasing company used by Doctor's Associates for franchising purposes) while negotiating a 1985 lease agreement.

The U.S. House of Representatives' small business committee studied the franchise industry from 1992 to 1998. Dean Sagar noted, "Subway is the biggest problem in franchising and emerges as one of the key examples of every abuse you can think of." In 1989, the U.S. Small Business Administration refused small business loans to Subway franchise owners until Subway removed a contract clause which gave it the power to seize and purchase any franchise without cause. The Dallas Morning News reported Subway had seized American soldier Leon Batie Jr.'s Subway stores in 2006 while he was serving in Afghanistan. He had been deployed to support Operation Enduring Freedom in March 2005, three years after buying his first restaurant. Batie alleged Subway had violated the U.S. Servicemembers Civil Relief Act. He filed a federal lawsuit against Subway, which was dismissed. He then filed suit in state court in Dallas County, Texas. Both parties settled on "mutually agreeable" and confidential terms in January 2010.

United Kingdom VAT treatment
In October 2010, Subway franchisees in the United Kingdom lost a high court appeal against paying standard VAT on all toasted subs, as required by HM Revenue and Customs. Thus, in the United Kingdom, a toasted sub attracts VAT, whereas a cold sub, eaten off the premises, does not. Competitors such as Quiznos and McDonald's do not pay VAT on similar food.

In March 2012, Chancellor of the Exchequer, George Osborne announced plans to close the loophole that allows Subway competitors to offer hot food without paying VAT. This legislation was expected to come into force from October 2012 onward, but on May 28, 2012, the government withdrew plans to charge VAT on originally hot food being allowed to cool naturally. In June 2012, Subway launched the "Toast the Tax" campaign to put pressure on the government to drop VAT on toasted sandwiches, as it has done for hot savouries.

Footlong trademark disputes
On January 31, 2011, Subway lawyer Valerie Pochron wrote to Casey's General Stores, a chain of Iowa-based convenience stores, demanding that the small chain cease using the term "footlong" in advertisements for its 12-inch sandwiches. Subway threatened to sue. Consequently, in February 2011, Casey's General Stores Inc. filed a petition in a U.S. District Court in Des Moines, seeking a legal declaration that the word "footlong" does not violate Subway's rights. Casey's further sought a declaration that the word "footlong" is a generic description of a sandwich measuring one foot. Before serving its complaint on Subway, Casey's voluntarily dismissed its action, ending the litigation.

Subway's trademark application for "footlong" has yet to be approved by the federal government. Subway has attempted to register it with the United States Patent and Trademark Office twice. It filed on November 8, 2007, and June 4, 2009. Both filings have been abandoned, on November 20, 2013, and August 21, 2014, respectively. Yum Brands (KFC, Pizza Hut, Taco Bell, and non-Canadian A&W locations), Long John Silver's, and other competitors opposed the applications.

Ingredients
Subway removed azodicarbonamide from its bread after food blogger and activist Vani Hari gathered more than 50,000 signatures in a petition drive. Before Vani Hari's petition, Subway had used azodicarbonamide as a bread conditioner, to whiten the dough and allow sandwich bread to bake more quickly.  , the ingredient was still used by other fast food restaurants.

In August 2015, Vani Hari again petitioned Subway in conjunction with Natural Resources Defense Council, Friends of the Earth, the Center for Food Safety, U.S. Public Interest Research Group to commit to buying meat produced without the routine use of antibiotics and to provide a timeline for doing so. In October 2015, Subway announced it would transition to chicken raised without antibiotics in 2016 and turkey within the following 2–3 years, and would also transition beef and pork raised without antibiotics by 2025.

In 2020, the Supreme Court of Ireland ruled that Subway bread had too high a sugar content to be classed as bread for VAT reasons, with its recipe including  sugar equal to 10% of the weight of the flour.

In 2021, a lawsuit was filed against the company alleging that the ingredient Subway bills as "tuna" was a mixture of "various concoctions that do not constitute tuna, yet have been blended together by defendants to imitate the appearance of tuna". The company's senior director for global food safety and quality said in a statement that "Our restaurants receive pure tuna, mix it with mayonnaise and serve on a freshly made sandwich to our guests." The investigative TV show Inside Edition sent samples of Subway's tuna salad to Applied Food Technologies, a Florida company that carries out DNA testing of seafood. According to that company, "Yes, we confirmed that tuna was definitely in all three samples we received." Subway established a website, SubwayTunaFacts.com, to refute the claims that they did not use real tuna, which they have denied unambiguously.

Soy protein in chicken products
In an investigation by the Canadian Broadcasting Corporation (CBC)'s consumer affairs television series Marketplace aired in February 2017, chicken from five fast-food restaurants was lab-tested to determine constituents. While DNA testing found between 84.9% and 89.4% of the DNA from other restaurants' chicken products to be chicken DNA, with the remaining being unidentifiable plant DNA, on the two Subway chicken items tested, 53.6% and 42.8% of the DNA was found to be chicken, with the remainder being mostly soy. Although ingredients listings did show soy protein to be a constituent of both of the chicken products, Subway states that the proportion is less than or equal to 1% and that the finding of about 50% soy DNA is not representative of the actual amount of soy in the product. Subway has called CBC's report "absolutely false and misleading" and demanded that it be retracted. Meanwhile, however, Subway Canada stated that it was investigating with its supplier to ensure that the proportion of soy protein was as per expectations.

According to Subway's website, U.S. stores' ingredients may differ from those in Canadian stores. Both countries include soy protein in chicken strips, but only the U.S. version states that it is present in quantities of 2% or less. The Canadian version includes soy as an ingredient in its chicken patty, but the United States version does not.

In April 2017, Subway sued the CBC, as well as the reporter and two producers, for $210 million, alleging the CBC acted "recklessly and maliciously" and that "these false statements... were published and republished, maliciously and without just cause or excuse, to a global audience, which has resulted in pecuniary loss to the plaintiffs." The CBC stood by its reports, stating that the DNA tests were done by independent and credible experts. The CBC's Emma Bédard stated that Subway had not provided an alternative explanation for the DNA test results obtained by the CBC.

In November 2019, Subway's lawsuit against the CBC was dismissed through anti-SLAPP legislation, as CBC's reporting was deemed to be a matter of public interest. In January 2021 the Ontario Court of Appeal overturned the decision dismissing the lawsuit.  The Supreme Court of Canada denied leave for appeal, so the matter has been returned to the Superior Court of Justice for trial.

Underpaying workers
In 2019, the Fair Work Ombudsman found that 17 Australian-based Subway franchises had underpaid workers. The lengthy investigation by the Ombudsman specifically found that franchises failed to pay the employees minimum wages, casual loadings, holiday and overtime rates, and did not issue proper pay slips or keep proper employment records. The investigation resulted in over $81,000 being recovered in unpaid wages for over 160 employees. Subway responded by introducing a rolling audit of franchisee employment records and commented that franchise agreements could be terminated if franchisees failed to meet Australian workplace laws and Subway's internal standards of operation.

Calls for boycott over the Russian invasion of Ukraine 
Following the 2022 Russian invasion of Ukraine, Subway was criticized for not divesting or scaling back its operations in Russia, unlike most of its competitors. Subway issued a statement saying, its corporate office does not own any of the 446 Subway stores in Russia, and issued a statement saying, "In addition to working with our franchisees across Europe to provide meals to refugees, we will redirect any profits from operations in Russia to humanitarian efforts supporting Ukrainians who have been affected by the war. Our restaurants in Russia are all independently owned and operated by local franchisees and managed by an independent master franchisee."

See also
 List of restaurant chains
 List of submarine sandwich restaurants

References

External links

 

 
1965 establishments in Connecticut
Companies based in Fairfield County, Connecticut
Companies based in New Haven County, Connecticut
Economy of the Northeastern United States
Fast-food chains of Australia
Fast-food chains of Canada
Fast-food chains of Singapore
Fast-food chains of the United Kingdom
Fast-food chains of the United States
Fast-food franchises
Milford, Connecticut
Multinational food companies
Privately held companies based in Connecticut
Restaurant chains in Singapore
Restaurant chains in the United States
Restaurant franchises
Restaurants established in 1965
Restaurants in Connecticut
Submarine sandwich restaurants